Vasily Petrovich Orlov, was a Russian Full General of Cavalry. Hero of Russo-Turkish Wars of (1768–1774) and (1787–1792). Ataman of the Don Cossacks, received orders to command the Indian March of Paul in January 1801 from Emperor Paul I of Russia. His wife Daria Fedorovna, was a daughter of Ataman Count Fedor Petrovich Denisov and son of Vasily Petrovich Vasily Orlov-Denisov, a Don Cossacks General in honour of his grandfather Fedor Petrovich Denisov added his surname to his own, becoming count Orlov-Denisov on 26 April 1801.

See also
Orlov-Denisov family
Denisov family

1745 births
1801 deaths
Don Cossacks
Imperial Russian Army generals
Recipients of the Order of St. George of the Third Degree